Parallel (stylized in all caps) is the fifth extended play (EP) by South Korean girl group GFriend. The EP was released digitally and physically by Source Music on August 1, 2017 and distributed by LOEN Entertainment. The album contains eight songs, including the single "Love Whisper", and one instrumental track. It has sold over 60,000 physical copies as of August 2017. The extended play was re-released on September 13 under the title Rainbow with the single "Summer Rain" and a bonus track of the same name.

Commercial performance

Parallel 
Parallel debuted at number 3 on the Gaon Album Chart, on the chart for July 30 – August 5, 2017. The EP also debuted at number 10 on the US World Albums chart, on the week ending August 19. The EP debuted at number 5 on the Gaon Album Chart, for the month of August 2017 with 61,473 physical copies sold.

Three songs from the EP entered the Gaon Digital Chart on the chart issue dated July 30 – August 5, 2017: "Love Whisper" at number 2; "One Half" at number 52 and "Ave Maria" at number 72.

Rainbow 
Rainbow debuted at number 2 on the Gaon Album Chart for September 10–16, 2017.

The two new songs from the repackage EP entered the Gaon Digital Chart for September 10–16, 2017. "Summer Rain" charted at number 11 and "Rainbow" at number 86.

Track listing

Charts

Sales

Awards and nominations

Music program awards

References

GFriend EPs
2017 EPs
Korean-language EPs
Kakao M EPs
Hybe Corporation EPs